Mark Beal Banks (June 5, 1883 – January 12, 1970) was an American football, basketball and baseball player, coach, and college athletics administrator. He served as the head football coach at Central University of Kentucky—now known as Centre College—in Danville, Kentucky (1909–1911), Ohio Wesleyan University (1912), Ohio University (1913–1917), Drake University (1918–1920), the University of Tennessee (1921–1925), and Hartwick College (1941–1948), compiling a career college football record of 100–73–10. Banks was also the head basketball and head baseball coach at Ohio Wesleyan, Ohio, Drake, and Tennessee. He played football, basketball, and baseball at Syracuse University.

College career
Banks graduated from Syracuse University in 1909. There he lettered in football (1905–1908), basketball (1908–1909), and baseball (1909). Banks was an Honorable Mention All-American quarterback in 1908.

Coaching career
Banks started his coaching career at Centre College in Danville, Kentucky in 1909. In 1912, Banks was head football coach at Ohio Wesleyan University in Delaware, Ohio compiling a record of 3–6 in his only season there. Banks then move to Ohio University in Athens, Ohio in 1913 and coached football five seasons there, going 21–18–2.

Banks became the 12th head football coach at Drake University located in Des Moines, Iowa and he held that position for three seasons, from 1918 until 1920.  His overall coaching record at Drake was 11–10–1. During his time at Drake, he was also the meet director for the (track and field) Drake Relays.

After coaching at Drake, Banks led the Tennessee Volunteers football team to a 27–15–3 record from 1921 to 1925. He was the football coach at Tennessee when the iconic orange became the main color for Tennessee's athletic teams. Banks also coached baseball and basketball at Tennessee. In 1927, Banks left for Central High School in Knoxville. Banks coached at Knoxville Central from 1927 to 1930.

In 1941, Banks became the athletic director, basketball, football, and baseball coach at Hartwick College in Oneonta, New York. Under Banks, Hartwick's football team had their first two winning seasons. Banks coached at Hartwick until 1948 and remained athletic director at the school until his retirement in 1950.
 
In 1996, Banks was inducted into the Hartwick College Athletic Hall of Fame. The M. Beal (Pops) Banks Award at Hartwick is awarded annually to "individuals, male and female, who have best pursued excellence in their sport to the best of their ability and have enthused others with their dedication and commitment".

Family
Banks was born on June 5, 1883 in Breesport, New York to parents David Thomas Banks (December 6, 1851 in Veteran, New York – December 1930 in Elmira, New York) and Emeline H. Parsons (December 25, 1852 in Catlin, New York – May 3, 1938 in Elmira, New York). Before attending Syracuse, Beal Banks graduated high school from the Elmira Free Academy in Elmira, New York. He married Gladys King (March 1888 – 1966) daughter of Rufus Everson King (July 15, 1859 – November 7, 1921) and Clara E. Ingersoll (June 1860 – ?) on October 29, 1910. Beal and Gladys had four children. Banks died January 12, 1970 in Parkersburg, West Virginia of a heart attack.

Head coaching record

Football

References

1883 births
1970 deaths
American football quarterbacks
American men's basketball players
Baseball players from New York (state)
Basketball coaches from New York (state)
Basketball players from New York (state)
Centre Colonels football coaches
Centre Colonels men's basketball coaches
Drake Bulldogs athletic directors
Drake Bulldogs baseball coaches
Drake Bulldogs football coaches
Drake Bulldogs men's basketball coaches
Hartwick Hawks athletic directors
Hartwick Hawks football coaches
Hartwick Hawks men's basketball coaches
Ohio Bobcats baseball coaches
Ohio Bobcats football coaches
Ohio Bobcats men's basketball coaches
Ohio Wesleyan Battling Bishops baseball coaches
Ohio Wesleyan Battling Bishops football coaches
Ohio Wesleyan Battling Bishops men's basketball coaches
People from Chemung County, New York
People from Horseheads, New York
Players of American football from New York (state)
Sportspeople from Elmira, New York
Syracuse Orangemen baseball players
Syracuse Orange football players
Syracuse Orange men's basketball players
Tennessee Volunteers baseball coaches
Tennessee Volunteers basketball coaches
Tennessee Volunteers football coaches